Bag is the first album by God Street Wine. It was released independently by Ripe & Ready records, containing many of the songs that would become staples of their concerts for years to come.

Track listing
All tracks by Lo Faber except where noted

 "Nightingale" – 5:48
 "Goodnight Gretchen" – 6:46
 "Feel the Pressure" (Pifer) – 5:54
 "Waiting for the Tide" – 6:25
 "Fortress of Solitude" – 7:14
 "Upside Down + Inside Out" – 4:46
 "Borderline" – 5:02
 "Better Than You" – 4:49
 "Hellfire" – 5:22
 "One Armed Man" (God Street Wine) – 7:07
 "Home Again" – 4:27
 "Epilog" – 7:29

Personnel

Jon Bevo – keyboards
Lo Faber – guitar, piano, vocals
Aaron Maxwell  – guitar, vocals, slide guitar
Dan Pifer  – bass guitar, vocals
Tomo  – percussion, drums, vocals

Production

Marie Feliu - photography
Rick Mathis-Rowe – mastering, mastering engineer
Joe Rogers  – engineer, technical consultant, production consultant
Rob Sinclair - artwork
Amy Tucci - executive producer
God Street Wine - producer, executive producer
Michael Weiss - organizer

References

1992 debut albums
God Street Wine albums